Burnley is a constituency centred on the town of Burnley in Lancashire which has been represented since 2019 by Antony Higginbotham, a Conservative.

History
The seat was created in 1868. From World War II until 2010 it was won by Labour candidates, generally on safe, large majorities; Ann Widdecombe failed to take the seat from the Labour Party in 1979. The closest second place was to a Conservative Party candidate, Ian Bruce, who came 787 votes (1.6%) short of taking the seat in 1983.

Burnley saw strong opposition support for the Liberal Democrats in 2005 who moved into second place; meanwhile a local independent pushed Yousuf Miah, a Conservative into fourth position. Following controversy regarding outgoing Labour MP Kitty Ussher's personal expenses, Gordon Birtwistle, who first contested the seat in 1992, gained the seat in 2010 with a heavy swing of 9.6%.

However, Birtwistle was one of the many casualties faced by the Liberal Democrats in the 2015 election, losing the seat to Julie Cooper, who had also stood as Labour's candidate in 2010, although the 6.2% swing away from Birtwistle was less than half the 15.2% national swing against his party. As in 2005, the Conservatives came fourth, behind UKIP, as well as Labour and the Lib Dems this time.

At the 2017 election, Labour held the seat with an increased majority. Birtwistle stood again, but saw his share of the vote halved; this was widely seen to be due to his party's stance on Brexit. This election saw one of the biggest increases in the share of the vote for the Conservatives in the whole country, who more than doubled their share of the vote. UKIP lost two-thirds of their vote from 2015, but did retain their deposit. This meant that Burnley was one of the few constituencies in England where four parties retained their deposits.

At the 2019 election, Antony Higginbotham won the seat for the Conservatives, thus becoming the first Conservative to represent Burnley in parliament for over 100 years. The Conservative vote share increased by over 9% compared with the previous election, while the Labour vote share declined by about 10%.

The review of parliamentary representation in Lancashire by the Boundary Commission for England in the 2000s proposed no change to the boundaries of the Burnley seat. The seat remains coterminous with the boundaries of the borough of Burnley (as it has been since 1983; before then, it was coterminous with the county borough of the same name).

Boundaries

1868–1885: The townships of Burnley, and Habergham Eaves.

1918–1983: The County Borough of Burnley.

1983–1997: The Borough of Burnley.

1997–present: As 1983 but with redrawn boundaries, due to local government boundary changes in the mid-1980s.

Members of Parliament

Elections

Elections in the 2020s

Elections in the 2010s

Elections in the 2000s

Elections in the 1990s

Elections in the 1980s

Elections in the 1970s

Elections in the 1960s

Elections in the 1950s

Election in the 1940s

Elections in the 1930s

Elections in the 1920s

Elections in the 1910s

A General Election was due to take place by the end of 1915. By the summer of 1914, the following candidates had been adopted to contest that election. Due to the outbreak of war, the election never took place.
British Socialist Party: Dan Irving

Elections in the 1900s

Elections in the 1890s

Elections in the 1880s

 Caused by Stagg's death.

 Caused by Ryland's death.

Elections in the 1870s

 Caused by Shaw's death.

Elections in the 1860s

See also
 List of parliamentary constituencies in Lancashire

Notes

References

External links 
nomis Constituency Profile for Burnley – presenting data from the ONS annual population survey and other official statistics.

Parliamentary constituencies in North West England
Constituencies of the Parliament of the United Kingdom established in 1868
Politics of Burnley